Alejandro Illescas Calderón (January 3, 1960 - January 17, 2008) was a Mexican voice actor who was heard in the Latin American dubs of many movies, TV series, and cartoons, often in small roles as policemen, reporters, or announcers.

Dubbing filmography

Feature films
Leon (Brion James) in Blade Runner (1982) (2004 dub)
Referee Al Kaplon in Dodgeball: A True Underdog Story (2004)
Watto in Star Wars: Episode I – The Phantom Menace (1999) and Star Wars: Episode II – Attack of the Clones (2002)
Happy Jack Mulraney (John C. Reilly) in Gangs of New York (2002)
Interpol councilmember in El Castillo de Cagliostro (2002)
Happy in Mickey's Magical Christmas: Snowed in at the House of Mouse (2001)
Dr. Eckermann in Cyborg 009 (2001 version) 
Happy in Snow White and the Seven Dwarfs (1937) (2001 dub)
Boris Badenov (Jason Alexander) in The Adventures of Rocky and Bullwinkle (2000) (home video version)
Parquis (Ian Hart) in The End of the Affair (1999 film)
James Levine in Fantasia 2000 (1999)
Gordon (Roscoe Orman) in The Adventures of Elmo in Grouchland (1999)
Stormtrooper in Star Wars (1977) (1997 dub)
Guards and gypsies in The Hunchback of Notre Dame
M. Bison in Street Fighter II: La Película (1994)
Construction worker in Mermaid's Scar (1993) 
Major Dutch Schaefer in Predator (1987)

Television
Happy in House of Mouse
Boomhauer (renamed Benavides) in King of the Hill (1997–2008)
Cheetor in Beast Wars (1996–1998)
Ebisu in Naruto
Genma Saotome in Ranma ½ (1993–1997)
Almighty Tallest Purple in Invader Zim (2001-2002)

References

External links
 
Good bye to the actor, Alejandro Illescas 
Doblaje en Espanol news

1960 births
2008 deaths
Mexican male voice actors
20th-century Mexican male actors
21st-century Mexican male actors
Place of birth missing